Parasitylenchidae is a family of nematodes belonging to the order Tylenchida.

Genera

Genera:
 Helionema Brzeski, 1962
 Heteromorphotylenchus Remillet & Van Waerebeke, 1978
 Heterotylenchus Bovien, 1937

References

Nematodes